"Figure It Out" is the third single from Lil' Chris' debut self-titled album. It was his first single that failed to reach the Top 40 in the UK. It peaked at number 57 in the UK and stayed on the chart for one week.

Track listing
CD1
 "Figure It Out" - 2:53 
 "Like You Know" - 3:50
CD2
 "Figure It Out" - 2:53
 "I've Been Had" [Live In London] - 3:40
 "Is She Ready?" [Live In Manchester] - 2:44
 "Rachel" [Live From Glasgow] - 2:36

References

2007 singles
Lil' Chris songs
2006 songs
Songs written by Martin Brannigan
Songs written by Ray Hedges
Songs written by Lil' Chris